A content rating (also known as maturity rating) rates the suitability of TV shows, movies, comic books, or video games to this primary targeted audience. A content rating usually places a media source into one of a number of different categories, to show which age group is suitable to view media and entertainment. The individual categories include the stated age groups within the category, along with all ages greater than the ages of that category.

See also

Film 
 Motion picture content rating system
 MPA film rating system
 Canadian Home Video Rating System
 Maritime Film Classification Board
 British Board Of Film Classification

Television 
 Television content rating system
 Federal Communications Commission
 TV Parental Guidelines
 United States pay television content advisory system

Video games 
 Video game content rating system
 Entertainment Software Rating Board
 Videogame Rating Council
 Pan European Game Information
 Computer Entertainment Rating Organization
 On Protecting Children from Information Harmful to Their Health and Development (Russia)

Internet 
 Content-control software
 Internet Content Rating Association
 Association of Sites Advocating Child Protection – RTA "Restricted to Adults" label 
 Platform for Internet Content Selection
 Internet Watch Foundation – maintains a website blacklist

Comics 
 Comics Code Authority
 Marvel Rating System
 DC Comics rating system
 Viz Media Manga distribution rating system 
 Tokyopop American Manga rating system 
 Image Comics rating system

Music 
 RIAA's Parental Advisory (Explicit Content rating)

Legal means of content regulation and prohibition  
 United States obscenity law
 Communications Decency Act
 Miller test
 Dost test

Various 
 Brazilian advisory rating system
 Federal Department for Media Harmful to Young Persons (Germany)

References 

 
Broad-concept articles
Minimum ages